During the 1962 Algerian War of Independence, Algerian women fought as equals alongside men. They thus achieved a new sense of their own identity and a measure of acceptance from men. In the aftermath of the war, women maintained their new-found emancipation and became more involved in the development of the new state.

The constitution of Algeria guarantees equality between genders. Women can vote and run for political positions.

Background

Algeria is a country in North Africa on the Mediterranean coast. After a prolonged rule by France, Algeria obtained independence from France in 1962. The Algerian Civil War (1991-2002) had a negative influence on women's wellbeing. 99% of the population is Arab-Berber, and a similar percentage is Muslim, predominantly Sunni. In Algeria, as in the rest of the MENA Region, women are traditionally regarded as weaker than men and expected to be subordinate to men. Algeria also has a strong culture of family honor, which is connected to women's modesty.

Marriage and personal life
The legal age for marriage is eighteen for women, twenty-one for men. Many Algerian women are getting married and starting families at much older ages than they did under French Rule. Education, work commitment, and changing social attitudes are the reasons for the change.

In 2010, the total fertility rate was 1.76 children born/woman. This is a drop from 2.41 in 2009 and 7.12 in the 1970s just after the Algerian War of Independence from France.

French colonizers opposed veiling because of their secular sovereign constitution and the concept of laïcité. The French secular constitution is based in the Declaration of the Rights of the Man and of the Citizen of 1789.

Education and employment
Prior to the country's Independence, very few native Algerian women could read and write. This was the result of a French-imposed ban on Islamic education for the entire native Algerian population. Which also led to the shut down of many schools, until there were barely enough schools to fit the needs of the country. The remnants of this policy still manifests today in the significantly low literacy rate found in women over the age of 40.

The literacy rate of women is still lower than that of men (it is female: 73.1% and male: 87.2%
as of 2015 estimates, population 15 years and older).

Post-Independence, North African and Algerian women enjoy many more human rights than their counterparts in neighboring and other African countries. Algerian women can inherit property, obtain a divorce, retain custody of their children, gain an education and work in many sectors of society. Women make up 70 percent of Algeria's lawyers and 60 percent of its judges. They also dominate the fields of medicine, healthcare and science. Increasingly, women contribute more to household income than men. As of 2007, sixty-five percent of university students are women, with more than 80% joining the workforce after graduation. They are encouraged by family members to become educated and contribute to Algerian society. Algerian women are among the first in North Africa to become taxi and bus drivers. Their numbers are also increasing in the police force and security positions.

Role of women in the Algerian War

Women fulfilled a number of different functions during the Algerian War. The majority of Muslim women who became active participants did so on the side of the National Liberation Front (FLN). The French included some women in their war effort, but they were not as fully integrated, nor were they charged with the same breadth of tasks as their Algerian sisters. The total number of women involved in the conflict, as determined by post-war veteran registration, is numbered at 11,000, but it is possible that this number was significantly higher due to underreporting.

There exists a distinction between two different types of women who became involved, urban and rural. Urban women, who constituted about twenty percent of the overall force, had received some kind of education and usually chose to enter on the side of the FLN of their own accord. Largely illiterate rural women, on the other hand, the remaining eighty percent, due to their geographic location in respect to the operations of FLN often became involved in the conflict as a result of proximity paired with force.

Women operated in a number of different areas during the course of the rebellion. "Women participated actively as combatants, spies, fundraisers, as well as nurses, launderers, and cooks", "women assisted the male fighting forces in areas like transportation, communication and administration", the range of involvement by a woman could include both combatant and non-combatant roles. While the majority of the tasks that women undertook centered on the realm of the non-combatant, those that surrounded the limited number that took part in acts of violence were more frequently noticed. The reality was that "rural women in maquis [rural areas] support networks" contained the overwhelming majority of those who participated. This is not to marginalize those women who did engage in acts of violence but simply to illustrate that they constituted in the minority.

Education
Education for both girls and boys are equal (93% and 95% respectively). Although Algerian women account for 53% enrolled in universities, they tend to be more focused on "traditional women careers" such as education and nursing. Algerian women are allowed to pick whatever career they choose to be in. The literacy rate for males are a little higher than female youth (94% and 89%).

Political participation

Prior to the war of independence, women were in general excluded from the political life. After independence in 1962, where women played an active role, they were badly represented in the building of the new state. During the first National Assembly, there were only 10 women out of the 194 members that were present. These women had all taken part in the war for independence. In the second meeting of the National Assembly, 2 out of 138 members were women.

The uprising that took place in October 1988 brought in a new a new constitution introducing a multi-party system. This led to the creation of many associations, among them associations for feminists and women in general. These associations made women more visible on the public arena. The four most visible and important among these associations were “equal rights for men and women”; “the triumph of women’s rights”; “the defence and promotion of women” and “the emancipation of women”.

From 1981 to 1991, women were proportionally represented in the small and marginal parties of the extreme left side. The Workers Party (PT) was led by a woman: Louisa Hanoune. Both the parties at the left wing and FLN represented women candidates at elections. The religious Islamist parties did not represent women candidates at elections, but women were allowed to be members.

Today, women are represented, although still not proportionally to men, in both parliament and in ministerial positions. In 2012, Algerian women occupied 31 percent of parliamentary seats, placing the country 26th worldwide and 1st in the Arab world. In 2012 political reforms were established, with the support of the United Nations Development Program, to provide a legal framework that granted women 30 percent representation in elected assemblies. On the local level, the rate is only 18 percent, due to the fact that it is difficult to find women willing to appear on ballots in the communes.

Following President Bouteflika's re-election in 2014, seven women were appointed as ministers in his cabinet. This adds up to 20 percent of all the ministerial positions. The women occupying the seven new ministerial posts are: Minister of Education Nouria Benghebrit; Minister of Land-Use Planning and Environment Dalila Boudjemaa; Minister of Culture Nadia Labidi; Minister of Family and Women Mounia Meslem; Minister of Post, Information Technology and Communication Zahra Dardouri; Minister of Tourism Nouria Yamina Zerhouni and Delegate Minister of Handicrafts Aish Tabagho. There has until this day not been a female head of state. Louisa Hanoune became the first women in both Algeria and the Arab world to run for office in 2004.

Economic participation

When it comes to owning land, women are at a major disadvantage. Their access to owning land is limited by the traditional laws of Algeria. Even through Algerian women by law have the right to access bank loans and are free to negotiate financial or business contracts, these actions are usually restricted by their husbands. Women in the workforce accounted for 37% versus men who accounted for 80%. The youth unemployment rate for males (43%) was slight lower than it was for females (46%). 60% of Algerian women are employed, but only half are on a salaried status. Basically speaking, the majority of women do not benefit from their employ ability status. Most Algerian women are employed by public administration and they occupy a lot of the teaching professions and "traditional" women careers in Algeria. "One exception is the medical profession; more than half of Algeria's doctors are women." In the year 2002, the National Committee of Working Women provided a center to help victims of sexual harassment in the workplace. In addition, there has been activists who have been campaigning for there to be a law to protect women from sexual harassment in the workplace.

Health

In regards to reproductive services, 96 percent of births were attended by a skilled health staff in 2002. Maternal mortality is still an issue somewhat in Algeria with some differences in different areas of the region. According to the Ministry of Health and Population, maternal mortality rates were cut in half in ten years. The maternal mortality ration in 2010 was 1 in 430 women. In 2011, Algerian women's use of sanitation facilities were at 95.1%. From the years 2008 to 2011, the number of females who had a comprehensive knowledge about HIV/AIDS at the ages of 15 to 24 years were 13.1%. 68% of women who were between the ages of 15 – 49 years thought that violence by their spouse was acceptable with in some certain situations. However, the people seemed that they did not believe in child marriage and only had 4 total in that year. Mothers seeking immunization for newborns and children ranged between 90% to 99% in the year 2012.

Family life for women
When it comes to legal protections for women in Algeria, the current protections in place are general/vague and insufficient. Women activists have had success bringing awareness to change the original family code to a more modernized equivalent benefiting and protecting women. The Family Code of 1984 is based on conservative religious principles. While the law was modified by Ordinance No. 05-02 of 27 February 2005, it still maintains many discriminatory provisions.

Notable figures
 Kahina - 7th century female Berber religious and military leader, who led indigenous resistance to Arab expansion in Northwest Africa.
 Djamila Bouhired and Djamila Boupacha - Algerian revolutionaries and nationalists who opposed French colonial rule of Algeria in the 1960s.
 Assia Djebar - Novelist, translator and filmmaker. Most of her works deal with obstacles faced by women, and she is noted for her feminist stance.
Zohra Drif - Retired lawyer and the vice-president of the Council of the Nation, the upper house of the Algerian Parliament.

See also

Algerian women in France
Algeria women's national football team
Algeria women's national volleyball team
Algeria women's national handball team
List of Algerian women artists
Women in the Algerian War
The Women of Algiers in Their Apartments
Algerian Family Code

References

External links 

 
Algerian culture
Society of Algeria
Algeria
Algeria